Maciste all'inferno is an album by French metal band Gojira. The album was recorded live while a projection of the movie Maciste all'inferno (1925) was running at the Rock School Barbey in Bordeaux on 29 May 2003. The album contains fifteen songs, about 50 minutes in length.

On 30 October 2020, Gojira shared a studio performance of a track called "Inferno", as extracted from the album, in Joe Duplantier's Silver Cord Studio.

Track listing

Personnel 
 Joe Duplantier – vocals, rhythm guitar
 Christian Andreu – lead guitar
 Jean-Michel Labadie – bass
 Mario Duplantier – drums

References 

2003 albums
Gojira (band) albums